Sakhi Elsa is an Indian costume designer or fashion designer working predominantly  in 
Malayalam film industry.

Early life
Sakhi completed her schooling in Sarvodaya Vidyalaya and Pre-University in Mar Ivanios College. Further she took her bachelor's degree in Commerce.

Pursuing her passion, in 2004 she completed her two-year post graduation course from National Institute of Fashion Technology in Knitwear Design & Technology.

Her collection titled ‘The Fragrance of a Dream’ (Mehak-E-Khwab) was spotlighted as the mid-way-opening collection of the 2004 Knitwear Design Show at NIFT.

Career
She has designed costumes for leading film actors including Mohanlal, Prakash Raj, Manisha Koirala, Nayanthara, Trisha, Dileep, Sreenivasan, Nivin Pauly, Dulquer Salmaan, Fahadh Faasil, Kunchacko Boban, Asif Ali, Suraj Venjaramoodu, Manoj K. Jayan, Biju Menon, Unni Mukundan, Prathap K. Pothan, K. P. A. C. Lalitha, Siddique, Saiju Kurup, Aju Varghese, Suhasini Maniratnam, Sameera Reddy, Samvrutha Sunil, Mamta Mohandas, Nithya Menon, Shwetha Menon, and Ann Augustine.

Filmography

As costume designer

As lyricist

Awards
Kerala State Film Award
 2017 Kerala State Film Award for Best Costume Designer - Hey Jude

References

External links

Kerala State Film Awards 2017 - Indian Express

Indian women fashion designers
Fashion stylists
Costume designers of Malayalam cinema
National Institute of Fashion Technology alumni
Artists from Thiruvananthapuram
Living people
Film people from Kerala
21st-century Indian designers
Women artists from Kerala
21st-century Indian women artists
Year of birth missing (living people)